Cyperus tetragonus is a species of sedge that is native to southern parts of North America.

See also 
 List of Cyperus species

References 

tetragonus
Plants described in 1816
Flora of Mexico
Flora of Arizona
Flora of Alabama
Flora of Florida
Flora of Georgia (U.S. state)
Flora of New Mexico
Flora of Mississippi
Flora of North Carolina
Taxa named by Stephen Elliott